Martin and Tidpit Downs is a  biological Site of Special Scientific Interest north-west of Fordingbridge in Hampshire.

This site is rich in prehistoric earthworks, including Bokerley Dyke. It has chalk grassland, heath and scrub, with a rich herb flora. Sheep grazing is increasing the botanical quality of the grassland. There is an outstanding assemblage of butterflies, with 36 species recorded, including marbled white, dark green fritillary, silver-spotted skipper and Duke of Burgundy.

References

Sites of Special Scientific Interest in Hampshire